Chris Wink (born 1961 in New York City, New York) is an American theater performer and director. He is one of the founding members of the Blue Man Group, as well as co-founder of Blue School. He has won numerous awards as a writer and performer, including a Grammy nomination, and is a frequent guest speaker on the topic of creativity.

Early life 
Wink was influenced early in his education when he attended an experimental elementary school located in the Teachers College at Columbia University. The school focused on creative writing and scientific exploration, rather than a rigid adherence to a standard curriculum. This helped shape what would become Wink's lifelong commitment to creativity, following his passion for artistic exploration. After attending high school at the Fieldston School, Wink majored in American Studies at Wesleyan University with a concentration in art history and pop culture. It was at Wesleyan that Wink started drumming. After graduation, Wink played drums by night with post-punk bands. A full-time job as a cater-waiter at Glorious Foods followed, where he worked with longtime friend Phil Stanton.

Funeral for the eighties 
Together with Wink's childhood friend Matt Goldman, Stanton and Wink began performing as Blue Men in small downtown venues such as LaMaMa E.T.C. and P.S. 122. In 1988, Wink and his friends planned the very first Blue Man Group event, "Funeral for the '80s," a procession through Central Park. There they set fire to what they considered the worst aspects of the decade, including a Rambo doll and a piece of the Berlin Wall. The event captured the interest of MTV, thrusting the character into the public consciousness.

Blue Man Group 
In 1991, Wink, Stanton, and Goldman opened Blue Man Group: Tubes at the Astor Place Theater. They expected the early shows would appeal only to the downtown scene, but soon they were adding performances and playing to sold-out crowds. Wink performed in over 1,200 shows without an understudy before they started to expand, training other performers in the qualities, humanity, and talents of the Blue Man. It was at this point that Wink and his co-founders started to consider other venues for their character.

The company's careful expansion, starting in 1995 in Boston at the Charles Playhouse and 1997 in Chicago's Briar Street Theatre, now extends internationally, with additional productions in Las Vegas, Orlando, and Berlin, as well as National and International Tours.

Wink ended his involvement with the Blue Man Group in 2017, amid a sense that he had become too corporate and less artistic.

Other projects

The Blue School 
In 2009, Wink, Stanton, and Goldman along with their wives Jen Wink Hays, Jennifer Stanton, and Renee Rolleri founded the Blue School. The Blue School is a progressive independent school in New York City's South Street Seaport. The school began as an informal playgroup and has since expanded to include programs for children from the pre-primary through middle school levels.

Wink World
In 2021, Wink announced a collaboration with the Las Vegas arts space Area15, serving as the organization's Director of Content and Cool Sh*t. He opened "Wink World: Portals Into the Infinite", a series of immersive psychedelic mirrored play rooms.  The project has some similarities to the infinity rooms of Yayoi Kusama, though an important difference is that Wink uses two way mirrors, to decrease the self-consciousness of the visitor when they see their own reflection.

References

American theatre directors
Wesleyan College alumni
American performance artists
1961 births
Artists from New York City
Living people